Samuel Lilly (October 28, 1815April 3, 1880) was an American Democratic Party politician, who represented  in the United States House of Representatives for one term from 1853 to 1855.

Early life and career
Lilly was born in Geneva, New York on October 28, 1815. He moved to Lambertville, New Jersey in 1829, and attended Rev. P.O. Studdiford's classical school. He graduated from the University of Pennsylvania School of Medicine on March 31, 1837, and commenced practice in Lambertville.

He was elected as the first Mayor of Lambertville, New Jersey serving in office from 1849 to 1852.

Congress
Lilly was elected as a Democrat to the Thirty-third Congress, serving in office from March 4, 1853, to March 3, 1855. In Congress, he was chairman of the Committee on Expenditures in the Post Office Department.

Later career
He served as director of the Board of Chosen Freeholders of Hunterdon County for eight years, and was brigadier general of the New Jersey Militia. He was appointed by President James Buchanan as consul general of the United States to British India, with residence in Calcutta, from January 3, 1861, and served until July 4, 1862, when he resigned.

He was judge of the Court of Common Pleas of Hunterdon County from 1868–1873, and was one of the members of the board of managers of the New Jersey Insane Asylum in 1871. He was a judge of the New Jersey Court of Errors and Appeals, then the state's highest court, and also a member of the State board of pardons from 1873 until his death in Lambertville on April 3, 1880.

Death
He died in 1880 and was interred in Mount Hope Cemetery in Lambertville.

External links

Samuel Lilly at The Political Graveyard

1816 births
1880 deaths
19th-century American diplomats
Mayors of places in New Jersey
County commissioners in New Jersey
New Jersey state court judges
People from Lambertville, New Jersey
Democratic Party members of the United States House of Representatives from New Jersey
Politicians from Geneva, New York
Perelman School of Medicine at the University of Pennsylvania alumni
19th-century American politicians
19th-century American judges